Fairmont can refer to:

Places

Canada 
 Fairmont Hot Springs, British Columbia, a resort town
 Fairmont Mountain, a summit near Fairmont Hot Springs

United States 
Fairmont, Illinois
Fairmont, Minnesota
Fairmont, Missouri
Fairmont, Nebraska
Fairmont State Airfield, Fairmont, Nebraska, listed on the NRHP in Nebraska
Fairmont, North Carolina
Fairmont, Oklahoma
Fairmont (Columbia, Tennessee), listed on the National Register of Historic Places in Tennessee
Fairmont (UTA station), a Utah Transit Authority station in Salt Lake City, Utah
Fairmont, West Virginia
Fairmont Downtown Historic District, Fairmont, WV, listed on the NRHP in West Virginia

Business 
 Fairmont Hotels and Resorts, a Toronto, Ontario-based operator
 Fairmont Railway Motors, an American former rail vehicle company, now part of Harsco Rail
 Ford Fairmont, an American automobile (1978–1983)
 Ford Fairmont (Australia), an Australian automobile

Education 
 Fairmont Preparatory Academy, a school in Anaheim, California
 Fairmont State University, a public university in Fairmont, West Virginia
 Fairmount College, a former college in Wichita that became Wichita State University

Music
Fairmont (band), American indie-rock band active 2001-

See also
Fairmount (disambiguation)